The Rufus Porter Museum of Art and Ingenuity is located in Bridgton, Maine. It is dedicated to the life and works of Rufus Porter (1792–1884). The museum is located on Main Street in two historic buildings and is open seasonally or by appointment.

References

External links
Rufus Porter Museum

Art museums established in 2005
Porter, Rufus
Art museums and galleries in Maine
Museums in Cumberland County, Maine
2005 establishments in Maine
Buildings and structures in Bridgton, Maine
Houses in Cumberland County, Maine